Springville is a city in Utah County, Utah, United States, that is part of the Provo–Orem metropolitan area. The population was 35,268 in 2020, according to the United States Census. Springville is a bedroom community for commuters who work in the Provo-Orem and Salt Lake City metropolitan areas. Other neighboring cities include Spanish Fork and Mapleton. Springville has the nickname of "Art City" or "Hobble Creek".

History

Springville was first explored in 1776 by Father Silvestre Vélez de Escalante, a Franciscan padre. What became Springville lay along the wagon route called the Mormon Road that Mormon pioneers and 49ers traveled through southern Utah, northern Arizona, southern Nevada and Southern California. From 1855, each winter trains of freight wagons traveled on this road across the deserts between Los Angeles and Salt Lake City until the late 1860s when the railroad arrived in Utah. During the year 1849, a group of pioneers led by William Miller and James Mendenhall traveled to the Provo River area. Mendenhall and Miller explored a little further south and fell in love with what is now known as the Hobble Creek area. Springville was settled in 1850 by eight pioneer families, led by Aaron Johnson, who crossed the plains to Salt Lake Valley from the East and were directed by Brigham Young to settle  further south.

Incorporated in February 1853, the pioneers called the city Hobble Creek because an early exploration team led by Oliver B. Huntington in February 1849 had a horse lose a pair of iron hobbles (restraints tied to the horse's forelegs) while the team was camped next to the creek. As the town grew, the name was changed to Springville. As the town grew, the name was changed to Springville, after the Fort Springville. Fort Springville was named after the many freshwater springs in the area, particularly near the fort. The original name was not completely lost, however, as the canyon stream (and associated canyons), a local elementary school, and city-owned golf course have retained the name Hobble Creek.

Springville is known as "Art City" due to its strong development of the arts. Springville is home to the Springville Museum of Art, Utah's oldest museum for the visual fine arts (circa 1937). The museum, housed in a historic Spanish Colonial Revival-style building, showcases collections of many well-known artists, both local and national, including collections of Utah art, a major Soviet collection, early Americana, and the European Steed collection. It was dedicated by David O. McKay as a "sanctuary of beauty and a temple of meditation." Springville is the birthplace of noted sculptor Cyrus Dallin. The main street is dotted with bronze statues, including several from local sculptors Gary Price and Jeff Decker.

Springville is a thriving community which has experienced steady growth over the past ten years. The current population is projected to grow to more than 50,000 over the next ten years, in line with the expected future expansion of its commercial, office, retail, and industrial sectors along the city's I-15 corridor.

Geography

All vehicular traffic that transports goods to the north, south, east and west funnels through the interstate hub near Springville's strategically important freeway location. A great potential with its strong connection to the arts, Springville is thriving community that has experienced steady growth over the past ten years. Its current population of 31,205 continues to increase with 4.6% annual growth.

Demographics

As of the census of 2000, there were 20,424 people, 5,975 households, and 5,024 families residing in the city. The population density was 1,770.5 people per square mile (683.3/km2). There were 6,229 housing units at an average density of 540.0 per square mile (208.4/km2). The city's racial makeup was 94.58% White, 0.11% African American, 0.62% Native American, 0.35% Asian, 0.28% Pacific Islander, 2.23% from other races, and 1.83% from two or more races. Hispanic or Latino of any race were 4.77% of the population.

There were 5,975 households, of which 51.5% had children under the age of 18 living with them, 72.4% were married couples living together, 8.7% had a female householder with no husband present, and 15.9% were non-families. 13.2% of all households were made up of individuals, and 5.8% had someone living alone who was 65 years of age or older. The average household size was 3.41 and the average family size was 3.76.

In the city, the population was spread out, with 37.4% under the age of 18, 12.7% from 18 to 24, 28.0% from 25 to 44, 14.0% from 45 to 64, and 7.9% who were 65 years of age or older. The median age was 25 years. The heavily weighted 18- to 24-year-old demographic is largely due to the city slowly attracting students and graduates from Brigham Young University, in the adjoining city of Provo, as well as Utah Valley University in the nearby city of Orem. For every 100 females, there are 98.5 males. For every 100 females age 18 and over, there were 94.9 males.

The city's median household income was $46,472, and the median family income was $48,845. Males had a median income of $37,942 versus $26,098 for females. The city's per capita income was $15,634. About 6.6% of families and 8.0% of the population were below the poverty line, including 10.1% of those under age 18 and 4.0% of those age 65 or over.

In 2010, the population had grown to 29,466. Ten years later, it had increased again to 35,268.

Business
Major businesses/employers in Springville include the following:

 digEcor, Inc, manufacturer of the digEplayer portable inflight entertainment device
 Flowserve, manufacturer of large valves, has a facility in Springville's Industrial Park
 Modere, which relocated its corporate headquarters to Springville in 2003
 Stouffer's, a division of Nestle, also has a plant in Springville's Industrial Park
 Wing Enterprises, maker of the Little Giant Ladder Systems is headquartered in Springville
 W.W. Clyde Company, a heavy construction firm
 Namify, a company specializing in name tags and other printing services
 Tatton Baird, Maker of custom hats and accessories

Local events
Art City Days, held each year in early June, is one of the first city celebrations of the summer season in Utah Valley. Residents join in a variety of activities to celebrate their community, its history, and the warmer weather. Activities include a parade, carnival, hot air balloons, contests, sporting events, and fireworks.

Springville is also home to the Springville World Folkfest, a week-long celebration of folk dance and music held every July at the outdoor amphitheater in the Spring Acres Arts Park. Folk dance groups travel from around the world to participate in this festival. Folkfest performers are housed by host families in the Springville area.

Every May, Springville hosts the annual Indian Festival of Utah also in Spring Acres Arts Park, the state's only cultural event devoted to East Indian, Pakistani, and South Asian communities across the Salt Lake City metropolitan area. Formerly held in nearby Spanish Fork, it represents the small but thriving Indian American and South Asian American communities of northern Utah.

Library
With Springville growing at such a fast rate, the need for a new library soon arose. The old library, the Springville Carnegie Library, could not fit the needs of the rapidly growing city. From 1965 to 2008, the library was housed in the north wing of the Springville Office Building of the time. The old building became the home of the Daughters of Utah Pioneers Museum and the Springville Historical Society.
Construction began on the current library in 2008 and was finished in 2011. Along with having over one million books, movies, and playaways, the new library hosts events, classes, and children's programs.

Education
Springville is served by Nebo School District. Public schools in this district within Springville include Springville High School, Springville Junior High School, Spring Canyon Middle School, Art City Elementary, Brookside Elementary, Cherry Creek Elementary, Sage Creek Elementary, and Westside Elementary. Reagan Academy and Merit Academy, both charter schools, are also in Springville.

The Elizabeth DeLong School of the Springville Campus of the Utah Schools for the Deaf and the Blind is in Springville. It construction begin in March 2019 with completion expected for January 2020. Jacoby Architects designed the school, which had a cost of $13 million.

Climate
Under the Köppen climate classification, Springville has a humid subtropical climate (Cfa) or a humid continental climate (Dfa) depending on which variant of the system is used.

Photos

Notable people
Charity Anderson (born 2000), dancer
Quinn Allman (born 1982), lead guitarist of alt-rock band The Used
Don Bluth (born 1937), film director, animator producer, writer, production designer, animation instructor
Chad Daybell (born 1968), author and husband of Lori Vallow; charged with multiple counts of murder
Jeff Decker (born 1966), sculptor
Claybourne Elder (born 1982), actor
Scott Mitchell (born 1968), NFL player
Gary Lee Price (born 1955), sculptor

See also
 List of cities and towns in Utah

References

External links

 

 
Cities in Utah
Populated places established in 1850
Provo–Orem metropolitan area
1850 establishments in Utah Territory
Mormon Road
Cities in Utah County, Utah